The VB Berapi LP06 is the first assault rifle designed and manufactured by Malaysia, and is not related to any previously licensed assault rifles made by VB Berapi. The LP06 is a bullpup assault rifle. It is chambered in the 5.56×45mm NATO round and is fed from a 30-round magazine. Hisham Abd Majid, the director of Vita Berapi in 2006, said that the rifle is designed by Viktor Prykhodko, a Russian residing in Malaysia.

See also
List of bullpup firearms
List of assault rifles

References

5.56 mm firearms
Assault rifles
Bullpup rifles
Weapons of Malaysia